Piot is a proper name of French origin:

Personal surname 
 Adolphe Piot (1825–1910), French painter
 Christian Piot (b. 1947), Belgian goalkeeper
 Georges Piot (1896–1980), French rower
 Jean Piot (1890–1961), French fencer
 Peter Piot (b. 1949), Belgian scientist

Geography 
 Piz Piot, Swiss mountain